Isaac Lewis White (born 22 June 1998) is an Australian professional basketball player for the Tasmania JackJumpers of the National Basketball League (NBL). He played college basketball for the Stanford Cardinal for three seasons, before graduating and signing to play basketball in Australia professionally.

Early life
White was born in Adelaide, South Australia, as the youngest of two siblings. He played for the Sturt Sabres of Australia’s Premier League and scored 65 points in a game against West Adelaide. In February 2017, White committed to play college basketball for the Stanford Cardinal.

College career
On 20 November 2017, he scored a career-high 20 points in a loss to the North Carolina Tar Heels. As a freshman, White averaged 5.5 points and 1.2 rebounds per game, starting nine of the team's 33 contests. He averaged 3.1 points and 1.0 rebound per game as a sophomore. White was named to the 2019 Pac-12 All-Academic Team. As a junior, he averaged 4.2 points per game. White graduated from Stanford after three seasons and initially decided to graduate transfer to California Baptist. However, he instead decided to pursue professional opportunities.

Professional career

Illawarra Hawks (2020–2022) 
On 24 July 2020, White signed a one-year deal with the Illawarra Hawks of the National Basketball League (NBL). On 13 July 2021, White re-signed with the Illawarra Hawks for the 2021–22 NBL season.

Tasmania JackJumpers (2022–present) 
On 4 August 2022, White signed with the Tasmania JackJumpers ahead of the 2022–23 NBL season as an injury replacement for Clint Steindl. His deal was converted to a development player contract on 28 September 2022.

National team career
At the 2016 FIBA U18 Oceania Tournament, White averaged 14.8 points, 6.8 rebounds, and 3.5 assists per game. White led South Australia to win the 2017 Australian U20 National Championship and led the tournament in scoring with 20.9 points per game. In 2019, he helped Australia win bronze at the Summer Universiade in Italy.

Career statistics

College

|-
| style="text-align:left;"| 2017–18
| style="text-align:left;"| Stanford
| 33 || 9 || 16.7 || .368 || .339 || .750 || 1.2 || .8 || .2 || .0 || 5.5
|-
| style="text-align:left;"| 2018–19
| style="text-align:left;"| Stanford
| 30 || 4 || 8.6 || .426 || .393 || .667 || 1.0 || .3 || .2 || .0 || 3.1
|-
| style="text-align:left;"| 2019–20
| style="text-align:left;"| Stanford
| 31 || 0 || 14.5 || .442 || .408 || .762 || 1.7 || .7 || .3 || .0 || 4.2
|- class="sortbottom"
| style="text-align:center;" colspan="2"| Career
| 94 || 13 || 13.4 || .403 || .372 || .734 || 1.3 || .6 || .2 || .0 || 4.3

References

External links
NBL profile
Stanford Cardinal bio

1998 births
Living people
Australian men's basketball players
Australian expatriate basketball people in the United States
Basketball players from Adelaide
Guards (basketball)
Illawarra Hawks players
Medalists at the 2019 Summer Universiade
People educated at Sacred Heart College, Adelaide
Stanford Cardinal men's basketball players
Tasmania JackJumpers players
Universiade bronze medalists for Australia
Universiade medalists in basketball